Gershom Whitfield Guinness (April 25, 1869 in Paris, France – April 12, 1927 in Peking) was a Protestant missionary in China, where he also was a practising medical doctor and a writer.

Biography 
A descendant of Guinness brewing family, he was a son of Henry Grattan Guinness, Irish Protestant missionary, originally from Dublin, who worked around the world for 15 years, and his wife and partner Fanny Grattan Guinness, née Fitzgerald. He was educated at the High School, Launceston, Tasmania; and Leys School, Cambridge. B. A. 1891. Enrolling into Caius college in 1888 to study medicine, he received his M. B. and B. C. there in 1896.

As most of his other siblings, he became a missionary and fulfilled one of his father's dreams by joining, as his sister Geraldine had done earlier, China Inland Mission, coming to Kaifeng, Henan, in 1900 and immediately barely escaped being slaughtered in anti-foreign Boxer Rebellion. He is mostly remembered for the letters he wrote to his father while escaping the rebels, and the book he wrote later recollecting his experience, "A Great Deliverance." His biography by his sister Geraldine was published in 1930.

Family 
Son Henry Whitfield Guinness (April 18, 1908, Kaifeng, Henan, China — February 17, 1996, Pembury, Kent) was a missionary in China. Henry's son Oswald Guinness became a U.S. author and Christian apologist.
Daughter Pearl Guinness (1910–1918), her brief life also subject of a book by Geraldine Taylor.

References 

1869 births
1927 deaths
Protestant writers
English Protestant missionaries
Protestant missionaries in China
British expatriates in China
Gershom Whitfield Taylor